IGIS may refer to:
 IGIS Asset Management, South Korea
 Institute of Geographical Information Systems, Pakistan
 Inspector-General of Intelligence and Security, in Australia and New Zealand

See also 
 Igis, a village in Switzerland